Schwesing (North Frisian: Swiasing) is a municipality in the district of Nordfriesland, in Schleswig-Holstein, Germany.

History

From September 25, 1944, until December 11, 1944, a concentration camp was established near Glasau. It was a subcamp to the Neuengamme concentration camp.

Culture 
Schwesing is one of the few places where the old, German card game of Bruus is still played. Tournaments are held regularly in the winter months and, in 2019, the 1st Bruus International Open took place.

See also
List of subcamps of Neuengamme

Notes

Neuengamme concentration camp
Nordfriesland